Goba may refer to:
 Goba, a town in Ethiopia
 Goba, Mozambique
 Goba (Tanzanian ward), an administrative ward of Dar es Salaam Region, Tanzania
 Goba (woreda) the district or woreda containing the town of Goba
 Great Ohio Bicycle Adventure (GOBA), an annual bicycle tour